MRT Center is a modern-era high rise building in Skopje, North Macedonia. At 70 m (230 ft) high, it was the tallest building in the country from its completion until the taller 130 m (427 ft) Sky City Sky Scrapers project was built in 2015. Constructed in 1984, the MRT Center is completely owned by Macedonian Radio Television, as its headquarters.

See also
 List of tallest buildings in North Macedonia

References

External links

 MRT Center at Emporis.com
 MRT Center diagram on SkyscraperPage.com

Buildings and structures in Skopje
Economy of North Macedonia
Macedonian Radio Television